Laika (stylized as LAIKA) is an American stop-motion animation studio specializing in feature films, commercial content for all media, music videos, and short films. The studio is best known for its stop-motion feature films Coraline, ParaNorman, The Boxtrolls, Kubo and the Two Strings and Missing Link. It is owned by Nike co-founder Phil Knight and is located in Hillsboro, Oregon, part of the Portland metropolitan area. Knight's son, Travis Knight, acts as Laika's president and CEO.

Laika had two divisions: Laika Entertainment for feature films and Laika/house for commercial content. The studio spun off the commercial division in July 2014 to focus exclusively on feature film production. The new independent commercial division is now called HouseSpecial.

History
In the late 1990s, Will Vinton Studios, known for its stop-motion films and commercials, sought funds for more feature-length films and brought in outside investors, which included Nike, Inc. owner Phil Knight, whose son Travis Knight worked at the studio as an animator. In 1998, Knight made his initial investment. In 2002, Phil Knight acquired the financially struggling Will Vinton Studios to pursue feature-length productions. The following year, Henry Selick, director of The Nightmare Before Christmas, joined the studio as a supervising director. In July 2005, Will Vinton Studios was rebranded as Laika – named after Laika, the dog sent to space by the Soviet Union in 1957.

It opened two divisions: Laika Entertainment for feature films and Laika/house for commercial work, such as advertisements and music videos. They also announced their first projects, the stop-motion film Coraline, and the CGI animated film Jack & Ben's Animated Adventure.

The studio laid off a significant portion of its staff in 2008, when its second planned feature, Jack & Ben's Animated Adventure, was cancelled. The following year, the studio released its first feature film, Coraline, directed by Selick. which received a nomination for the Academy Award for Best Animated Feature, a nomination at the BAFTAs for Best Animated Feature, a nomination for the Golden Globe Award for Best Animated Feature Film, and eight nominations at the Annie Awards, winning three, for Best Music in an Animated Feature, and Best Character Design and Production Design in a Feature Production.

After directing Moongirl and Coraline, and unsuccessfully renegotiating his contract, Selick departed Laika in 2009. At the end of the year, the studio laid off more staff in its computer animation department to focus exclusively on stop-motion.

Their second stop-motion feature film, ParaNorman, directed by Sam Fell and Chris Butler opened on August 17, 2012. It received a nomination for the Academy Award for Best Animated Feature, as well as a nomination for Best Animated Feature at the BAFTAs, and eight nominations at the Annie Awards, winning two, for Character Animation and Character Design in an Animated Feature Production.

After working on stop-motion commercials for clients such as Apple Inc., Fox Sports, ESPN and Coca-Cola, Laika spun off its advertising portion in July 2014, to focus on feature film production exclusively. The new independent commercial division is now called HouseSpecial.

Their third film, The Boxtrolls, was released on September 26, 2014. It was based on Alan Snow's fantasy-adventure novel, Here Be Monsters! and was directed by Anthony Stacchi and Graham Annable. It received an Academy Award nomination for Best Animated Feature, a Golden Globe nomination for Best Animated Feature, and nine nominations at the Annie Awards, winning two, for Voice Acting and Production Design in an Animated Feature Production.

Their fourth film, Kubo and the Two Strings, directed by Travis Knight was released on August 19, 2016. It received two nominations at the Academy Awards, for Best Animated Feature and Best Visual Effects (as only the second animated film to receive that nomination, after The Nightmare Before Christmas). It won the BAFTA for Best Animated Feature. It also received a nomination for Best Animated Feature at the Golden Globes, and ten nominations at the Annie Awards, winning three, for Character Animation, Production Design and Editorial in a Feature Production.

Laika had considered Philip Reeve's fantasy book Goblins, for a potential feature film adaptation.

In March 2015, the company announced it would expand the studio in an effort to allow for production of one film per year.

Their fifth film, Missing Link, directed by Chris Butler was released on April 12, 2019. It received an Academy Award nomination for Best Animated Feature and eight nominations at the Annie Awards. It also won a Golden Globe for Best Animated Feature.

On February 8, 2021, Laika signed a distribution deal with Shout! Factory for the United States, covering the studio's first four films. 

On March 31, 2021, Laika announced their first live-action film based on the action thriller novel Seventeen by John Brownlow who is said to be a fan of Laika's previous work. It was also confirmed that the studio is currently working on their sixth stop-motion animated film Wildwood.

On April 27, 2022, a new Laika stop-motion film titled The Night Gardener was announced as being in the works, based on an original screenplay by Ozark creator Bill Dubuque with Travis Knight penned to direct it.

On February 7, 2023, the studio announced that former Netflix executive Matt Levin was appointed as the President, Live-Action Film & Series, and will oversee the studio's entire live-action output, reporting directly to Travis Knight.

Filmography

Feature films

Released films

Upcoming films

Short films

Contract work

See also
 List of companies based in Oregon
 Arthouse animation
 Indiewood

References

External links

 

American companies established in 2005
Companies based in Hillsboro, Oregon
American animation studios
Film production companies of the United States
Mass media companies established in 2005
Privately held companies based in Oregon
2005 establishments in Oregon